Max-Schmeling-Halle is a multi-purpose arena, in Berlin, Germany, named after the famous German boxer Max Schmeling. Apart from Mercedes-Benz Arena and the Velodrom, it's one of Berlin's biggest indoor sports arenas and holds from 8,861 people, up to 12,000 people.

The opening ceremony took place on 14 December 1996 in the presence of Max Schmeling.

Location
The Max-Schmeling-Halle is situated in the former border area of Berlin, near the Mauerpark and directly next to the Friedrich-Ludwig-Jahn-Sportpark. It's situated at the Falkplatz, in the district Prenzlauer Berg (borough Pankow).

Use

Planned for the 2000 Summer Olympics as a pure box gym, it was rebuilt (after the games were awarded to Sydney as the venue) to a multi-functional gym and is now primarily used for boxing and team handball and is the home arena of Füchse Berlin HBC and the Berlin Mini Basketball Tournament (berliner-mini-turnier.de).

Madonna performed 4 sell out concerts  in the arena during her Drowned World Tour in June 2001. 

On 9 May 2001, Irish vocal pop band Westlife held a concert for their Where Dreams Come True Tour supporting their album Coast to Coast.

World Wrestling Entertainment was there twice, in April 2005 and 2006.

The 2019 CEV Champions League Grand Final was held at the arena and the next edition, the 2020 Finals was scheduled to be held at the arena as well, before being canceled to PalaOlimpia at Verona, Italy, as the 2021 Finals.

See also
List of indoor arenas in Germany

References

External links
 
 

Handball venues in Germany
Indoor arenas in Germany
Sports venues in Berlin
Defunct basketball venues
Volleyball venues in Germany
Sports venues completed in 1996
Venues of the Bundesvision Song Contest